Wayside School Gets a Little Stranger is a 1995 children's short story cycle novel by American author Louis Sachar, and the third book in his Wayside School series.

Plot 
 1. Explanation Louis finally removes every cow that had crowded the school in Wayside School is Falling Down. After 243 days, the students and faculty all return to the school. Todd is the one who is the most excited about returning to Wayside School out of everyone else, as he was sent to the most horrible school he had ever been to: the reader's.

 2. A Message From The Principal The principal of Wayside, Mr. Kidswatter, gives a seemingly professional speech on the PA system. However, he forgets to turn the PA off upon finishing, and loudly expresses irritation about having to return from his extended vacation to Jamaica.

 3. Poetry The students are assigned to write poems about a specific color. Allison decides to write a poem about the color purple, but can't figure out a word that rhymes with "purple". Likewise, Rondi decides to write a poem about the color blue, but can't find a good rhyming word for "blue". When the poems are turned in, the students have written very strange poems about the colors they chose, while Rondi decided to not write anything.

 4. Doctor Pickle The chapter introduces Dr. Pickell, who is also known as "Dr. Pickle", though his name is not the reason (it is pronounced with emphasis on the second syllable). Dr. Pickell is a psychiatrist who uses a pickle-like stone to hypnotize people and use aversion therapy to break bad habits. As a prank, he also adds an additional stipulation to their treatment. For example, when he helps a woman quit smoking by making her think her cigarettes feel and taste like worms, he also makes her slap her husband's face when he says the word "potato." He is ultimately disbarred from practicing psychiatry, so he becomes a counselor at an elementary school.

 5. A Story with a Disappointing Ending Paul is sent to visit the new school counselor, as he cannot control his urge to pull Leslie's pigtails. The psychiatrist uses a strange pickle-like stone to hypnotize Paul, making him think Leslie's pigtails are rattlesnakes when he tries to grab them, but also adding that he will see Leslie's ears as candy when he hears the word "pencil". After Paul returns to class, Leslie breaks her pencil, and borrows one from a classmate; this is all accomplished without saying the word "pencil".

 6. Pet Day All of the students bring their pets to school. The pets have unusual names, leading to confusion from Mrs. Jewls. The chapter is structured similarly to Abbott and Costello's "Who's on First?"

 7. A Bad Word After Mr. Kidswatter spills coffee on his new suit while opening a door, he declares "door" a forbidden word, and requires everybody to call it a "goozack" from that point forward. Todd shows up late to school, and is subsequently punished for saying "door".

 8. Santa Claus It is almost Christmas, but Kathy is the only one in the class who does not believe in Santa Claus. When Louis comes into the classroom dressed as Santa Claus, Kathy tries to prove that Santa Claus isn't real. Mrs. Jewls eventually resolves the situation by saying that Louis is one of Santa's helpers, and the class vows to help Santa Claus even if he isn't real.

 9. Something Different About Mrs. Jewls The kids suspect that something is different about Mrs. Jewls when they notice that she's eating strange things and getting overly-emotional over everything that she sees. Their suspects are confirmed when Mrs. Jewls tells the class that she is pregnant and expecting her first child. Mrs. Jewls announces that she will be on maternity leave, and a man named Mr. Gorf will be substituting for her.

 10. Mr. Gorf The class waits for Mr. Gorf arrive to class; they remain on their best behavior, as they fear that Mr. Gorf is the husband of their harsh former teacher, Mrs. Gorf. They soon they realize that he hasn't arrived, and figure that he must be hiding, so they resume work as normal. Myron, however, cracks under the pressure. Using the freedom he obtained in the last book, he jumps on the tables and sits at the teacher's desk. The other students worry about his misbehavior, but he assures Mr. Gorf isn't there, only to find him in the closet.

 11. Voices At first, Mr. Gorf seems like a nice teacher with a gentle Scottish accent, but then he reveals that he is the son of Mrs. Gorf. Mr. Gorf has the ability to take away one's voice by sucking it up a third nostril in his nose. He can then mimic it perfectly just by touching his nose. He eventually steals the voice of every student in the room, and uses their voices to reassure other teachers that everything is normal. After a visit from Miss Mush, the lunch teacher, Mr. Gorf uses Kathy's voice to tell her, "Have a nice day!"

 12. Nose With his talent for mimicry, Mr. Gorf decides to take revenge on the class for causing the demise of his mother. He calls the students' mothers and insults them using their own voices, mocking the children for being unable to stop him. However, Miss Mush foils him by smashing a pepper pie in his face, causing him to sneeze repeatedly until his nose comes off. Eventually, the voices he stole return to their rightful owners (although it takes a few minutes for the voices and people to line up correctly, due to the number of voices taken). Miss Mush, upon hearing "Have a nice day!" in Kathy's voice, had decided that either Kathy had a change of heart, or Mr. Gorf could steal voices. Since Kathy would never be so friendly, she correctly assumed the latter. At the end of the chapter, it is revealed that Mr. Gorf's initial voice belonged to a Scottish man who lost his voice 20 years previously; because Mr. Gorf lost his nose, he is able to speak again.

 13. The New Teacher The second of the substitutes, Mrs. Drazil, arrives. She appears to be open and friendly, but Deedee suspects that she has a dark side, though she cannot place why.

 14. A Light Bulb, a Pencil Sharpener, a Coffeepot, and a Sack of Potatoes Mrs. Drazil's class throws a light bulb, a pencil sharpener, a coffeepot, and a sack of potatoes out of a window to see which one lands first. The coffeepot was borrowed from Mr. Kidswatter's office, and has not been seen since the experiment. Afterwards, Leslie notes that the class will need a new pencil sharpener. Paul licks her ears, as she says the word "pencil."

 15. An Elephant in Wayside School All is well with Mrs. Drazil and the students, until Deedee realizes her suspicion; Louis had mentioned Mrs. Drazil in the previous book as his former teacher whom he hated. Upon meeting Mrs. Drazil again, Louis is forced to shave his mustache and finish a homework assignment he missed over 15 years prior. When he insults her, she places a wastepaper basket over his head.

 16. Mr. Poop With Mrs. Drazil watching him, Louis drops his casual, fun-loving personality, turning into a strict Professional Playground Supervisor. He refuses to let the kids play with the balls because they are filthy and not properly inflated, and later refuses to let the kids onto the playground because the blacktop is gray and needs to be painted black. A fed-up Joy throws his handbook into the paint can.

 17. Why the Children Decided They Had to Get Rid of Mrs. Drazil The title is paradoxical to the entire plot. It is noted that Mrs. Drazil is nice, patient, fair, and even a good cook. However, since she forced Louis to shave his mustache, the students decide that she has to go.

 18. The Blue Notebook The students abscond with Mrs. Drazil's blue notebook, intent on reading it. In so doing, they realize that in order to get rid of Mrs. Drazil, they must find Jane Smith, the only student that Mrs. Drazil dislikes more than Louis. Jane Smith left Mrs. Drazil a nasty note stating that she didn't do her last twelve homework assignments; she also mentions that she is moving and won't say where. She closes her note by telling Mrs. Drazil to "rub a monkey's tummy with [her] head."

 19. Time Out Miss Zarves has a cow in her class, presumably left over from the events in the previous book. The cow continually distracts Miss Zarves to the point where she can no longer teach. She goes to Mr. Kidswatter to complain, but he doesn't see or hear her. Deciding that she doesn't feel valued, she finally storms out of the school, intending to quit. However, three mysterious men, one holding an attaché case, stop her and explain that the school needs her, and that her work is highly valued. Miss Zarves returns to her classroom feeling reassured.

 20. Elevators Elevators are installed in the school, but one can only go up and one can only go down. They work perfectly, but only once.

 21. Open Wide Jason has a dentist appointment with Dr. Payne, but his appointment is interrupted by a phone call from an irate mother who refuses to pay for her child's tooth extraction, because the wrong tooth was pulled. Jason overhears the dentist on the phone telling the patient to "rub a monkey's tummy with her head," and subsequently confirms through her dental certificate that Dr. Payne is Jane Smith.

 22. Jane Smith Jason tells Deedee that he found Jane Smith, and they intentionally make Mrs. Drazil aware of Jane Smith's whereabouts, occupation, and name change. Later, Mrs. Drazil breaks into Jane's house, intent on forcing her to do her missed homework. Jane escapes in a motorboat, but injures her ankle when she jumps onto the concrete below; Mrs. Drazil pursues her in a rowboat, and the two are never seen again.

 23. Ears This chapter introduces Miss Wendy Nogard, who has an ear on the top of her head that allows her to hear other people's thoughts. After her boyfriend Xavier Dalton ditched her upon discovering her third ear, she became bitter and hateful, intentionally hurting every man she dated by focusing on their negative thoughts. Meanwhile, Xavier began dating other women, but broke all of their hearts, as he never fully realized his love for Wendy. Wendy especially hated children for being so happy, and became a substitute teacher.

 24. Glum And Blah Miss Nogard arrives in class, and although the class appears eager, she intends to ruin their moods by listening to their thoughts and capitalizing on them. Calvin is embarrassed because he spilled juice on his lap, and Miss Nogard asks him if he has to go to the bathroom. Dana worries that her new haircut makes her look like a boy, and Miss Nogard intentionally calls her a "young man". She regularly calls Jason by the name of his more successful older brother, Justin, whom he loathes. D.J. has a song he hates stuck in his head, and Miss Nogard hums it constantly whenever he's nearby. Bebe has an itch on her leg, and when she stops thinking about it, Miss Nogard walks by and scratches her own leg. Jenny is going horseback riding after school, but after Miss Nogard tells a lie about her nephew who went horseback riding on a rainy day and broke his limbs, she becomes upset. At the end of the day, all of the students are feeling "glum and blah", but they believe this is due to their own shortcomings.

 25. Guilty After Miss Nogard hears Maurecia's thoughts that she accidentally ripped a page in the dictionary, she purposefully has her confess to it. Upon Maurecia's confession, Miss Nogard makes her read both sides of the torn page to the class, then announces that there will be a test afterward, as the page is unusable and must be memorized, to the other students' dismay. Maurecia is unsure how Miss Nogard knew about her mistake, but decides that one of her classmates must have told her.

 26. Never Laugh At A Shoelace Mac forgets to bring something for show and tell, but the moment he realizes this, Miss Nogard calls on him. Low on ideas, he decides to uses his shoelace; the other students are nonplussed. He invents a story about an African man named Howard Speed, the fastest man in the world, who lived before shoelaces were invented, which invests all of the classmates. Mac concludes that one should never laugh at a shoelace, and the entire class applauds.

 27. Way-Up-High Ball The Erics play a game of "way-up-high ball", where they throw a ball to bounce on the school wall and get points equal to the number of stories the ball reaches. The person who catches the ball also scores the same number of points, so the thrower can double their own points by catching their throw. In the event that the ball doesn't hit the wall, no points are rewarded, and it is deemed a "glopper". While speaking to Louis, the other students ask if he has a crush on Miss Nogard, but he reasons that she's far above him, both physically and metaphorically. Finally, Louis attempts a throw; the ball never comes back down, as it hits somewhere between the 18th and 20th stories, and there is no 19th story.

 28. Flowers For A Very Special Person Louis brings in flowers, intending them for Miss Nogard, but ultimately giving them to Mr. Kidswatter instead. Under his breath, he calls Mr. Kidswatter "a maggot-infested string bean," and when asked to repeat himself, he instead says "a magnificent human being".

 29. Stupid After Miss Nogard hears Ron thinking about how he didn't complete his homework, she continually calls on Ron for the review, intending to humiliate him. She also always calls on students who got questions wrong, and eventually assigns them three pages of homework, in addition to redoing the previous homework. As a result, the students turn on each other, and Miss Nogard listens in on their bitter thoughts.

 30. The Little Stranger Mrs. Jewls returns with her baby girl, Mavis. All of the students immediately forget their anger and take turns holding the baby, though Miss Nogard seems unenthusiastic. She offers to hold Mavis, intending to drop her out of the window, when she suddenly realizes that she hasn't heard a baby's thoughts before. According to the book, babies don't think in words, but rather in pure love and unconditional trust; as she listens in, her bitterness fades away. The students convince Louis to ask her out on a date, and Wendy accepts. She also reveals her third ear, which the class accepts without hesitation. Louis reaffirms his love for Wendy, who knows that it is genuine without reading his thoughts.

Substitute teachers

Mr. Gorf

Mr. Gorf was the son of Mrs. Gorf (who tormented the students before being turned into an apple and eaten).He was never married, causing his students to think he wasn't related to Mrs. Gorf. He had three nostrils in his nose—the middle one had the power to steal people's voices and make them his own. He was so spiteful about the children taking his mother away that he used their voices to call their mothers and insult them. He then lost his own voice, along with the others, when he sneezed them all out, ultimately sneezing his own nose off. The voice he used when he first appeared was stolen from a Scotsman 20 years prior, and his real voice sounds like a French donkey with a sore throat. Even the Scotsman's voice is returned when Mr. Gorf loses his nose.  His last name is ¨Frog¨ spelled backwards.

Mrs. Drazil

Mrs. Drazil keeps a blue journal of all the troublesome students she's had since she started teaching decades ago. She treats the Wayside School students nicely, but not her former students (including Louis). Her last name is "Lizard" spelled backwards.

Ms. Wendy Nogard

Wendy has an ear on top of her head that can hear thoughts. When she was dumped by her boyfriend Xavier, she began to make everyone's life miserable. After listening to the thoughts of Mrs. Jewls' newborn child, she has a change of heart. She also falls in love with Louis and shows everyone her third ear. Louis says that he loves her too; she doesn't have to hear his thoughts, as she can see it in his eyes. Her last name is "Dragon" spelled backwards.

1995 American novels
Novels by Louis Sachar
Wayside School
HarperCollins books
American children's novels
Novels set in elementary and primary schools
1995 children's books